The cảnh or tiu cảnh is a Vietnamese musical instrument. It is a form of small cymbal. These percussion instruments are placed on the floor and struck with wooden beaters.

References

Vietnamese musical instruments